The 1966 Gettysburg Bullets football team was an American football team that represented Gettysburg College during the 1966 NCAA College Division football season. The Bullets placed second in the Middle Atlantic Conference, University Division, but were awarded the Lambert Cup as the best football team at a mid-sized college in the East.

In their 10th year under head coach Eugene M. Haas, the Bullets compiled a 7–2 record. Rod Albright, Dick Shirk and Brian Tierney were the team captains.

Gettysburg finished the year on a six-game win streak. After the second straight win, the Bullets entered the national College Division Coaches Poll at No. 18; two weeks later they rose to No. 17, and remained in that rank at the end of the year.

Both of Gettysburg's early-season losses were to divisional rivals, yielding a 4–2 MAC University Division record, good for only second place. Nonetheless, the Bullets leapfrogged Delaware – which had beaten them in the league standings and in their head-to-head matchup – in the Lambert Cup balloting. Gettysburg had not been the top choice of any of the selectors, but were mentioned among the top 10 on each of the 10 ballots. The surprise selection irked fans of Delaware, which had been named No. 1 on five of the ballots, but entirely omitted from two of them. 

The Bullets played their home games at Musselman Stadium in Gettysburg, Pennsylvania.

Schedule

See also
 1964 Gettysburg Bullets football team, Gettysburg's only championship team in 12 years of MAC University Division play

References

Gettysburg
Gettysburg Bullets football seasons
Gettysburg Bullets football